Road Atlanta (known for sponsorship reasons as Michelin Raceway Road Atlanta) is a  road course located just north of Braselton, Georgia, United States. The facility is utilized for a wide variety of events, including professional and amateur sports car and motorcycle races, racing and driving schools, corporate programs and testing for motorsports teams. The track has 12 turns, including the famous "esses" between turns three and five; and Turn 12, a downhill, diving turn. The track is owned by IMSA Holdings, LLC through its subsidiary Road Atlanta, LLC, and is the home to the Petit Le Mans, as well as AMA motorcycle racing, and smaller events throughout the year. Michelin acquired naming rights to the facility in 2018.

History

In 1969, David Sloyer, Earl Walker, and Arthur Montgomery purchased a  plot of farmland in Braselton, Georgia, with the intent to build a world-class road racing facility. When a Can-Am race had to be canceled due to flood damage, the series organizers chose Road Atlanta to replace it. The track then began to take form quickly, taking only six months to excavate, grade, and pave the road course.

The first race was held on September 13, 1970. Vic Elford, in a Chaparral 2J, won pole and Tony Dean, in a Porsche 908/02, won the 300 km Can-Am event, with Stirling Moss as the Grand Marshal.  Throughout the 1970s, more top-level series came to Road Atlanta, including Can-Am, Formula 5000, IMSA Camel GT, and Trans-Am.  The Sports Car Club of America (SCCA) held their annual national championship, the SCCA Runoffs, at Road Atlanta from 1970 to 1993. The first road race in NASCAR Busch Grand National Series history took place at Road Atlanta in 1986.

The track was sold in 1978, and was passed from one owner to the next—culminating in bankruptcy in 1993 under the Whittington Brothers (Don & Bill). Business executives Frank Drendel, Jim Kanely, Eddie Edwards, George Nuse, and Bill Waddell formed a partnership to purchase the track. They spent the next three years making gradual improvements to the facility. New buildings were constructed, others were renovated, the track was widened and resurfaced and the grounds were landscaped.

In November 1996, Don Panoz purchased the track and made Braselton the base of operations for his motorsports-related ventures. Panoz introduced the first major changes to the track, removing the Dip and creating a chicane at the end of the long back straight. These changes brought the track up to FIA standards, so that international events could be held. A new pit and paddock area was also constructed on the infield side of the track, allowing for larger events, and a 10,000-seat terrace area was constructed around the new Turn 10 complex.

In 1998, major racing resumed at Road Atlanta with the first edition of the Petit Le Mans endurance race. The race attracted worldwide attention, and included entries from the Le Mans-winning Porsche factory team. The race would be the first race of the American Le Mans Series and included a spectacular accident where a Porsche 911 GT1 backflipped and flew into the side barriers. Petit has continued to be an annual event at Road Atlanta, and a marquee event in the ALMS.

Prior to the 2007 Petit Le Mans, the entire track surface was repaved. The works also included moving the walls in the esses away from the track, with the intention of improved driver safety and better sight lines for spectators. In the late winter of 2007/2008, the circuit was again modified with the reconfiguration of turns 4 and 12, for the ostensible safety benefit of motorcycle racers (the racing line for cars remained essentially unchanged).

In April 2008, Road Atlanta hosted the 4th stage of the Tour de Georgia, one of the largest cycling stage races in the United States. The stage was run using standard racing bikes instead of the more aerodynamic time trial bikes. Slipstream Chipotle won the stage with a time of 19:38.86, while Astana and Team High Road finished second and third respectively. Used in local cycling events, the circuit is run counterclockwise (in reverse), owing to safety issues from the downhill Turn 11 to Turn 12, creating a steep climb from Turn 12 to Turn 11, and a much safer route for cycling.

The October 2008 Petit Le Mans had a four-day crowd of 113,000 people with an average weekend crowd of nearly 80,000 fans.  The race entry list includes a number of new and returning cars.

In September 2012, the track was purchased by IMSA Holdings as part of its acquisition of Panoz Motor Sports Group. The intention was to combine the Grand AM and American Le Mans Series. NASCAR K&N series has announced a return to the track in October 2013 as part of the NASCAR K&N Pro Series East.

In December 2017, the track hosted its first 24 Hours of LeMons event, the Kim Harmon Scrotium 500. The series is also scheduled to return in 2018.

In 2019, the track became Michelin Raceway Road Atlanta after Michelin and IMSA Holdings announced the naming rights agreement.

In 2020, Michelin Raceway hosted the PNC Atlanta 10 Miler: Extreme Hill Edition and 4k Races because of the COVID-19 pandemic.

In gaming
The track was first included in the 1999 PC racing simulator Sports Car GT. Road Atlanta is featured in the Xbox video game Forza Motorsport and all its subsequent entries.

The track was also digitally created for Electronic Arts' F1 series ('01 – '02), then modded to be compatible with multiple PC games. Scratch-made versions of the track have also been created for rFactor, Papyrus' NASCAR Racing 2003 Season, and BeamNG.drive. It also appears in the PlayStation 2 game Le Mans 24 Hours and on iRacing.com.

In November 2022, the track was added to the PlayStation game Gran Turismo 7. The track was added to the game as part of update 1.26, which was released to mark the series' 25th anniversary.

Lap records

The outright unofficial all-time track record is 1:01.200, set by Marc Gené in a Ferrari F2003-GA, during a 2018 Ferrari Corsa Clienti event. As of October 2022, the fastest official race lap records at Road Atlanta for different classes are listed as:

Track configurations

Events

Current
IMSA WeatherTech SportsCar Championship
Petit Le Mans
IMSA Michelin Pilot Challenge (formally IMSA Continental Tire Sports Car Challenge)
IMSA Cooper Tires Prototype Lites
IMSA Porsche GT3 Cup Challenge presented by Yokohama
Formula D
Drift Atlanta
Trans-Am Series
Historic Sportscar Racing
The Mitty
American Endurance Racing 
TireRack.com ChampCar Endurance Series
24 Hours of LeMons presented by Yokohama
National Auto Sport Association
Sports Car Club of America
Global Time Attack
Z Nationals

The facility is also home to the Skip Barber Racing School.

Former
PNC Atlanta 10 Miler (2020)
Indy Lights (2001)
NASCAR Busch Series (1986 & 1987)
NASCAR K&N Pro Series East (2013)
Pro Mazda Championship presented by Cooper Tires (1999–2010, 2012)
Star Mazda Series - East Championship (1999–2004)
Cooper Tires USF2000 (2010)
Can-Am (1970–1974, 1978–1979, 1982, 1984)
AMA National Championship (1971–1974, 1980, 1986–1988) (races in 1986-1988 were also counted in the AMA Superbike Championship)
SCCA National Championship Runoffs (1970–1993) (also known as the American Road Race of Champions, Valvoline Road Racing Classic, and the Champion Spark Plug Road Racing Classic)
SCCA Formula Super Vee Championship (1971–1975, 1979, 1989–1990)
SCCA Continental Championship (1972–1973, 1975) 
IMSA GT Championship (1973–1992, 1994–1998)
AMA Superbike (1980, 1986–1990, 1993–1994, 1998–2010, 2012)
American Le Mans Series (1999–2013)
Grand-Am Rolex Sports Car Series (2013)
World Karting Association

See also
 Atlanta Motor Speedway

References

External links

Map and circuit history at RacingCircuits.info

Buildings and structures in Hall County, Georgia
Sports venues in Atlanta
Motorsport venues in Georgia (U.S. state)
Panoz Auto Development
IMSA GT Championship circuits
NASCAR tracks
American Le Mans Series circuits
Tourist attractions in Hall County, Georgia
1970 establishments in Georgia (U.S. state)
Sports venues completed in 1970
Road courses in the United States